Neeraj Kumar Singh alias Bablu (born 1969) is an Indian politician who is serving as a Member of the Bihar Legislative Assembly from the Chhatapur representing the Bharatiya Janata Party. He became Minister of Environment and Forest in Seventh Nitish Kumar ministry on February 9, 2021.

Early life and education
Bablu was born 2 February 1969 in Maldiha village in the Purnia district of Bihar to his father Ram Kishor Singh. He is married to Nootan Singh, they have two sons. He belongs to the General Class Rajput community. He holds a Bachelor of Applied Science degree.

He is the cousin of the famous Bollywood actor Sushant Singh Rajput, who died in June 2020.

Political career
He stepped in politics earlier but has come into action in 2005 as a member of Janata Dal (United) by defeating Uday Kumar Goit from Raghopur-Supaul Constituency which he served till its delimitation in Bihar Vidhan Sabha. In 2010 he was elected from Chhatapur (Vidhan Sabha constituency). Later he quit JD-U and joined BJP. He was elected to Vidhan Sabha from Chhatarpur as member of BJP in 2015 and 2020.

References

Living people
People from Supaul district
Bharatiya Janata Party politicians from Bihar
Bihar MLAs 2005–2010
Bihar MLAs 2010–2015
Bihar MLAs 2015–2020
1969 births
Janata Dal (United) politicians
Bihar MLAs 2020–2025